The Nykredit Architecture Prize is the largest Danish architecture prize. Founded by the Nykredit Foundation (an arm of the Nykredit Group), it is awarded annually to a person, or group of people, who have personally, or through their work, made a significant contribution to the building industry in the form of architecture or planning, etc. The recipient receives DKK 500,000, making it one of the largest architecture prizes in the world in terms of prize money.

In 1991 the Nykredit Foundation began awarding the Motivational Award/Encouragement Prize to talented young architects who have made an impact on the architecture scene.

Recipients

Motivational Award
 2015: 	Cornelius+Vöge
 2014: 	Svendborg Architects
 2013: Effekt
 2012: Powerhouse Company
 2011: JAJA Architects
 2010: Mette Lange
 2009: Polyform
 2008: ONV Arkitekter 
 2007: Dan Stubbergaard
 2006: TRANSFORM/Lars Bendrup

Encouragement Prize
 2005: 	NORD Arkitekter 
 2004: 	Henrik Valeur
 2003: 	Kollision/Andreas Lykke-Olesen, Rune Nielsen and Tobias Løssing
 2002: 	Hanne Birk and Merete Lind Mikkelsen
 2001: 	Christina Capetillo
 2000: 	Sergio George Fox
 1999: 	Hotel Proforma
 1998: 	Arkitekturtidsskrift B
 1997: 	Jens Lindhe
 1996: Inge Mette Kirkeby
 1995: 	Pluskontoret
 1994: none awarded
 1993: 	Kristine Jensen, Otto Käszner and Jens Rørbech 
 1992: Merete Ahnfeldt-Mollerup and Thomas Wiesner
 1991: 	Suzanne Eben Ditlevsen

See also
 Architecture of Denmark
 C. F. Hansen Medal

References

External links
 Nykredit Architecture Prize
 Nykredit Motivational Award/Encouragement Prize
 Nykredit Foundation
Architecture awards
Awards established in 1987
Architecture awards of Denmark